The Missouri Military Academy (MMA) is a private preparatory school established on November 22, 1889, in Mexico, Missouri. The academy is a selective, all male, boarding school, grades 7 to 12. As a U.S. Army Junior Reserve Officers' Training Corps (JROTC) Honor Unit With Distinction (as designated by the U.S. Department of the Army), it has the privilege of nominating cadets to the U.S. Military Academy, Naval Academy, Air Force Academy, and Coast Guard Academy.

History

The academy's first president was Colonel Alexander Fleet, a Confederate veteran who was present at Appomattox Court House when General Lee surrendered to General Grant at the conclusion of the American Civil War. From its beginning, the academy was very popular, "placing upon its rolls representatives from every congressional district and 20 states."

The original academy, situated on West Boulevard in Mexico, was destroyed by fire in 1896. In 1900, the school was re-established by the Businessmen's Association of Mexico on its present site at the eastern outskirts of the city. Subsequent presidents were Colonel Alexander Yancey (1900-1902), Colonel William Fonville (1903-1911), Colonel Walter Kohr (1911-1914), and Colonel Emmette Burton (1914-1933). In 1933, an organization headed by Colonel Charles Stribling, Jr., assumed control. Colonel Stribling had been on the faculty since 1920 as teacher, coach, assistant commandant and commandant of cadets. In 1948, Colonel Stribling directed the reorganization of the academy into a nonprofit educational corporation governed by a board of trustees of alumni, faculty, and friends.

The Missouri Military Academy Alumni Association and the tradition of Homecoming were rejuvenated in 1955 and operate under the alumni association board of directors. In 1968, Colonel Charles Stribling III, '44, was named president. A member of the faculty for 16 years, Colonel Stribling III had served as teacher, coach, commandant, executive officer, and director of alumni affairs, development, and public relations. Colonel Stribling, Jr., was elevated to the position of chairman of the board of trustees and served in that capacity until his death at age 86, in his 63rd year on the faculty. The administration building, built in 1900 and a historical focal point of the campus, was renamed Stribling Hall by the board of trustees in 1981 in honor of his contributions to the academy, the community, and the nation.

Colonel Ronald Kelly was elected president of MMA in 1993, with Colonel Charles Stribling III continuing as chairman of the board of trustees. Colonel Kelly was a faculty member since 1969 and served MMA as a teacher, coach, advisor, director of admissions, and executive officer. Following the school year 2006–2007, Major General Robert Flannigan, U.S. Marine Corps, retired, replaced Colonel Kelly as president. General Flannigan came to MMA from Admiral Farragut Academy in St. Petersburg, Florida, where he served as business advisor and commandant. Colonel Stribling III stepped down as chairman but remained a member of the board.

In 2012, Charles McGeorge was named president of MMA. McGeorge was the 10th president of Valley Forge Military Academy and College, serving from 2004 to 2010. He came to MMA from McGeorge & Co., a limited liability company he founded in 2010 to provide consulting services to independent schools and colleges.

In 2019, Brigadier General Richard V. Geraci, USA (Ret) succeeded Charles McGeorge as 11th president of Missouri Military Academy. Geraci joined MMA as chief academic officer on July 1, 2017. His role was then expanded on March 1, 2018, and his title changed to vice president for academics, operations and planning. Prior to his arrival, he was the president of Leavenworth Regional Catholic School System and principal of Immaculata High School.

Buildings

The campus was expanded by the completion of the Junior School Academic Building (1956), the Little Field House (1957), the Academic Building (1958), the Memorial Chapel (1961), the Administration Building annex (1963), Cadet Hospital (1964), the Field House (1967), "E" Barracks (1968), an Academic Building addition (1969), the Natatorium (1981), a Junior School Academic Building addition (1982), the Centennial Gymnatorium (1988), the new "D" Barracks (1991), the Maintenance Building (1992), an all-weather track and soccer field (1993), Brad Calvert Field (1994), the new "C" Barracks (1995), the Laundry Building (1996), the new "B" Barracks (2002), Rappelling Tower (2002), and an Academic Building addition (2009). This latest addition was the first high school building in Missouri to receive a Leadership in Energy and Environmental Design certification by the U.S. Green Building Council. The building, named "Barnard Hall" after Les Barnard, '48, was completed in time for the opening of school. In 2012, the reconstruction of Stribling Hall was completed and the building fitted with a new gold dome, one of few in Missouri.

School life
In 1985, MMA was designated as an "Exemplary Private School" by the U.S. Department of Education. The academy is a College Board test center for central Missouri. In 2003, the academic program was expanded to include dual-credit courses, allowing cadets to accumulate college credit hours while fulfilling high school requirements. School year 2007-2008 saw the incorporation of the academy's first National Honor Society chapter. In 2008, Advanced Placement course offerings increased to nine.

MMA offers 11 varsity sports and regularly wins state military school championships. In addition, there are athletic opportunities for all cadets in the Raider Program, physical education, horseback riding, and intramural sports. The state championship drill team, the Fusileers, the marching band, and color guard continue to bring renown to the school. The units have been selected to represent the State of Missouri in presidential inaugural parades, and they have performed at televised college and professional sporting events. The Fusileers also represent MMA at the National High School Drill Team Championships where they have been nationally ranked.

Notable alumni

 Maxie Anderson (1934–1983), U.S. Congressional Gold Medal recipient
 Randall Carver (born 1946), American film and television actor
 Clifton Cates (1893–1970), 19th Commandant of the U.S. Marine Corps
 Dale Dye (born 1944), American film and television actor, advisor, writer
 Howard Hughes, Sr. (1869–1924), founder of Hughes Tool Company
 Albert C. Hunt (1888-1956), Associate Justice of the Oklahoma Supreme Court.
 Jess Larson (1904–1987), 1st Administrator of the U.S. General Services
 Ed Lindenmeyer (1901–1981), College All-America Team football tackle
 Judd Lyons (born 1962), Senior officer of the Army National Guard
 "Reb" Russell (1905–1978), American football running back and film actor
 Guy Troy (born 1923), American modern pentathlete and summer olympian

See also
 List of boarding schools
 List of high schools in Missouri
 List of U.S. military schools and academies

References

Further reading

External links

 
 
 

 
501(c)(3) organizations
1889 establishments in Missouri
Boarding schools in Missouri
Boys' schools in Missouri
Buildings and structures in Audrain County, Missouri
Educational institutions established in 1889
Junior Reserve Officers' Training Corps
Mexico, Missouri
Military high schools in the United States
Preparatory schools in Missouri
Private schools in Missouri
Schools in Audrain County, Missouri